The Hayswood Nature Preserve is a county park owned by the Harrison County, Indiana Park and Recreation Board.

The Samuel P. Hays donation

The preserve was donated to the citizens of Harrison County in 1969 by Samuel P. Hays, A Corydon native and Professor Emeritus of History at the University of Pittsburgh.  The parks board developed a portion of the land in 1973 for public use, but the majority of the land remains in its original condition to be preserved for the future.  Although the entire park is open to the public, the nature reserve area is to always kept free of development to continue Hays' dream of natural preservation of the land.

The park property has a history as interesting as its nature.  The property was previously owned by Henry L. Fabrique. In 1820 he constructed a water mill in the curve of Indian Creek.  He later sold the mill to John Peter Mauck, the founder of Mauckport, whose family operated the mill until the advent of electricity in the 1920s. The same mill was one of many threatened with burning by Confederate General John Hunt Morgan after the Battle of Corydon.

Park area

The forest consists largely of oak-hickory forest with beech-maple forest closer to the creek.

The park has a paved looped hiking trail along the north part of the park. There is a large playground on the western side, a fishing lake near the creek, primitive restrooms, and picnic areas. The Doolittle section of the Indian Creek Trail passes through the park and features a walking bridge over the creek.

See also
Corydon, Indiana

References

Gallery

Protected areas of Harrison County, Indiana
Nature reserves in Indiana
1969 establishments in Indiana
Protected areas established in 1969